Ward Township is a township in Todd County, Minnesota, United States. The population was 471 at the 2000 census.

Ward Township was organized in 1877, and named after Ward Township, Randolph County, Indiana, the native home of a share of the early settlers. The sculptor Joseph Kiselewski was born in Ward Township early in the 20th century. Examples of his work can be seen at the American Heritage National Bank and in front of Christ the King church. Both are in  near-by Browerville.

Geography
According to the United States Census Bureau, the township has a total area of 36.3 square miles (94.0 km); 35.9 square miles (92.9 km) is land and 0.4 square mile (1.1 km) (1.16%) is water. The Long Prairie River flows northwardly through the township.

Demographics
As of the census of 2000, there were 471 people, 176 households, and 134 families residing in the township.  The population density was 13.1 people per square mile (5.1/km).  There were 213 housing units at an average density of 5.9/sq mi (2.3/km).  The racial makeup of the township was 99.36% White, 0.21% Asian, and 0.42% from two or more races. Hispanic or Latino of any race were 1.06% of the population.

There were 176 households, out of which 34.1% had children under the age of 18 living with them, 69.9% were married couples living together, 3.4% had a female householder with no husband present, and 23.3% were non-families. 22.2% of all households were made up of individuals, and 6.8% had someone living alone who was 65 years of age or older.  The average household size was 2.68 and the average family size was 3.16.

In the township the population was spread out, with 28.5% under the age of 18, 5.9% from 18 to 24, 22.5% from 25 to 44, 27.2% from 45 to 64, and 15.9% who were 65 years of age or older.  The median age was 40 years. For every 100 females, there were 114.1 males.  For every 100 females age 18 and over, there were 116.0 males.

The median income for a household in the township was $33,304, and the median income for a family was $37,031. Males had a median income of $29,750 versus $22,500 for females. The per capita income for the township was $15,830.  None of the families and 1.9% of the population were living below the poverty line, including no under eighteens and 2.6% of those over 64.

References

Townships in Todd County, Minnesota
Townships in Minnesota